Minuscule 525 (in the Gregory-Aland numbering), ε 513 (in the Soden numbering), is a Greek-Slavic diglot minuscule manuscript of the New Testament, on a parchment. Palaeographically it has been assigned to the 15th century.
It has marginalia. Scrivener labelled it by number 491.

Description 

The codex contains the complete text of the four Gospels on 312 parchment leaves (size ). It is written in two columns per page, 31-22 lines per page.

Text 

The Greek text of the codex is a representative of the Byzantine text-type. Hermann von Soden classified it to the textual family Kx. Aland placed it in Category V.

According to the Claremont Profile Method it represents mixed Byzantine text in Luke 1, Kx in Luke 10, and Textus Receptus in Luke 20 (almost identical).

History 

The Slavic text was written in 1429 by Gabriel, a monk, in Moldavia. Another later hand added the Greek text.

The manuscript once belonged to M. Aloys. Canonici, together with the manuscripts 522, 523, and 524, then to Bandinelli from Venice, and in 1817 was acquired by the Bodleian Library.

The manuscript was added to the list of New Testament minuscule manuscripts by F. H. A. Scrivener (491) and C. R. Gregory (525). Gregory saw it in 1883.

It is currently housed at the Bodleian Library (MS. Canon. Gr. 122) in Oxford.

See also 

 List of New Testament minuscules
 Biblical manuscript
 Textual criticism

References

Further reading 

 

Greek New Testament minuscules
15th-century biblical manuscripts
Bodleian Library collection
East Slavic manuscripts
Cyrillic manuscripts